Bloomer is a town in Chippewa County in the U.S. state of Wisconsin. The population was 1,050 at the 2010 census, up from 926 at the 2000 census. The city of Bloomer is also located in Chippewa County, but to the south of the town within the adjacent town of Woodmohr.

Geography
The town of Bloomer is a  rectangle in northwestern Chippewa County. Marsh-Miller Lake is in the eastern part of the town.

History

The  squares that would become Bloomer were first surveyed in July 1847 by a crew working for the U.S. government. In September 1852, other crews marked all the section corners of the six mile squares, walking through the woods and wading the swamps, measuring with chain and compass. When done, the deputy surveyor filed this general description of the western six miles:
This Township contains a large quantity of good Timber Pine Oaks & Sugar Maple are usually mixed throughout this Township. The Surface is mostly undulating (except a few small swamps) the Soil is light consisting of a few inches of Leaf mould with a gravell or rocky subsoil, Two small creeks head mostly in this Township &(?) run South.

Demographics

As of the census of 2000, there were 926 people, 321 households, and 246 families residing in the town.  The population density was 19.7 people per square mile (7.6/km2).  There were 335 housing units at an average density of 7.1 per square mile (2.7/km2).  The racial makeup of the town was 99.57% White, 0.11% Native American, and 0.32% from two or more races.  0.22% of the population were Hispanic or Latino of any race.

There were 321 households, out of which 38.3% had children under the age of 18 living with them, 67.6% were married couples living together, 4.7% had a female householder with no husband present, and 23.1% were non-families. 17.8% of all households were made up of individuals, and 5.6% had someone living alone who was 65 years of age or older.  The average household size was 2.88 and the average family size was 3.29.

In the town, the population was spread out, with 30.5% under the age of 18, 7.8% from 18 to 24, 27.6% from 25 to 44, 24.1% from 45 to 64, and 10.0% who were 65 years of age or older.  The median age was 36 years. For every 100 females, there were 105.8 males.  For every 100 females age 18 and over, there were 101.9 males.

The median income for a household in the town was $40,057, and the median income for a family was $44,028. Males had a median income of $29,327 versus $24,615 for females. The per capita income for the town was $16,243.  About 4.3% of families and 6.4% of the population were below the poverty line, including 9.8% of those under age 18 and 1.8% of those age 65 or over.

References

External links
Town of Bloomer official website

Towns in Chippewa County, Wisconsin
Eau Claire–Chippewa Falls metropolitan area
Towns in Wisconsin